Charles Thomas Worsfold Mayo (5 February 1903 – 10 April 1943) was a Canadian-born British cricketer who played six first-class matches for Somerset in 1928.

Educated at Eton College, where he was in the cricket team alongside Gubby Allen, Mayo was a right-handed batsman who featured in the Somerset middle order in six matches in the early part of the 1928 season. He made 35 and 60, his highest score, in his first match against Nottinghamshire at Trent Bridge. And in the next game, against Warwickshire at Edgbaston, he made 48. But he was not successful in his other games and did not appear in first-class cricket again.

He was killed during the North African campaign in the Second World War.

References

1903 births
1943 deaths
People educated at Eton College
English cricketers
Somerset cricketers
Canadian cricketers
Cricketers from British Columbia
Sportspeople from Victoria, British Columbia
British Army personnel killed in World War II
Royal Armoured Corps soldiers
North Somerset Yeomanry soldiers
Canadian military personnel from British Columbia